Live & Well may refer to:

 Live & Well (B.B. King album), 1969
 Live & Well (Gap Band album), 1996
 Live and Well, a 2004 album by Dolly Parton

See also
 LiveAndWell.com, a 1999 live album by David Bowie
 'Live and Well in Japan!, a 1978 album by Benny Carter
 Alive and Well (disambiguation)